Saturday Night is an album by the Bear Quartet, released in 2005.

Track listing
"I Know My Owner" – 4:19
"Birds Are Singing Deep Within the Greenery" – 3:43
"Loneliness Abandons the Lonely" – 1:50
"I Have an Itch" – 2:26
"I Speak Much English" – 3:44
"Little Ghost" – 4:45
"Weakling Keep Blinking" – 6:06
"The Supremes" – 2:17
"Today I Will Dress Up" – 2:56
"Your Name Here" – 5:53
"Class Trip" – 3:07
"Death to The Bear Quartet" – 4:26

2005 albums
The Bear Quartet albums